Henry Chauncey Riley (December 15, 1835 - 1904) was first missionary bishop of what is now the Anglican Church of Mexico serving from 1879 to 1884 when he resigned his jurisdiction.

External links 
History of Anglicanism in Mexico
Archival collection

1835 births
1904 deaths
Bishops of the Episcopal Church (United States)
19th-century American Episcopalians
Anglican bishops of Mexico
19th-century American clergy